The 2017–18 National First Division was the season from August 2017 to May 2018 of South Africa's second tier of professional soccer, the National First Division.

League table

Playoffs

References

External links
PSL.co.za

National First Division seasons
South
2017–18 in South African soccer leagues